The 1996 Dunhill Cup was the 12th Dunhill Cup. It was a team tournament featuring 16 countries, each represented by three players. The Cup was played 10–13 October at the Old Course at St Andrews in Scotland. The sponsor was the Alfred Dunhill company. The American team of Phil Mickelson, Mark O'Meara, and Steve Stricker beat the team from New Zealand of Frank Nobilo, Greg Turner, and Grant Waite in the final. It was the third win for the United States.

Format
The Cup was a match play event played over four days. The teams were divided into four four-team groups. The top eight teams were seeded with the remaining teams randomly placed in the groups. After three rounds of round-robin play, the top team in each group advanced to a single elimination playoff.

In each team match, the three players were paired with their opponents and played 18 holes at medal match play. Matches tied at the end of 18 holes were extended to a sudden-death playoff. The tie-breaker for ties within a group was based on match record, then head-to-head.

Group play

Round one
Source:

Group 1

Canonica won on the second playoff hole.

Group 2

Group 3

Group 4

Waite won on the fourth playoff hole.

Round two
Source:

Group 1

Group 2

Sandelin won on the first playoff hole.

Singh won on the first playoff hole.

Group 3

Harrington won on the first playoff hole.

Group 4

Round three
Source:

Group 1

Group 2

Group 3

Goosen won on the first playoff hole.

Group 4

Standings

Playoffs
Source:

Bracket

Semi-finals

Waite won on the third playoff hole.

Final

Team results

Player results

References

Alfred Dunhill Cup
Dunhill Cup
Dunhill Cup
Dunhill Cup